Pseudaesopia japonica, the wavyband sole or Seto sole, is a species of sole native to the western Pacific Ocean, where found over sandy mud bottoms. This species is the only known member of its genus. This species grows to a length of  SL.

See also
 Aesopia and Zebrias: Two related genera with a similar striped pattern

References

Soleidae
Taxa named by Paul Chabanaud
Monotypic fish genera